"Too Hot" is a song recorded by the American band Kool & the Gang for their 1979 album Ladies' Night. It was written by George Brown and Kool & the Gang, and produced by Eumir Deodato and Kool & the Gang. The song reached number five on the US Billboard Hot 100.

Record World said that the song "offers a midtempo pace with delightful keyboards &
vocals."

Track listing
De-Lite Records - DE-802 - 6168.772:

Charts

Weekly charts

Year-end charts

Coolio version

In 1995, American rapper Coolio covered the song for his second studio album, Gangsta's Paradise (1995). Major parts of the original were retained, but supplemented by independent rap passages. In the rap passages he also addresses the disease HIV/AIDS.

Critical reception
British columnist for Dotmusic, James Masterton viewed the song as "another extremely commercial piece of Gangsta rap and another instant Top 10 hit." He added, "My only query is just who decided to release a record called Too Hot in the middle of a freezing cold January?"

Music video
The accompanying music video for "Too Hot" was directed by David Nelson.

Charts

Weekly charts

Year-end charts

Certifications

2004 version

In 2004, Kool & the Gang released The Hits: Reloaded album, which features their greatest hits performed by various artists. "Too Hot" was recorded by British singer Lisa Stansfield and released as a promotional single from The Hits: Reloaded in selected European countries in September 2004.

Track listings
European promotional CD single
"Too Hot" (Kool & the Gang featuring Lisa Stansfield) – 4:32
"Where Da Boogie At!" (Kool & the Gang featuring R.O.C. & Da Prince Hakim) – 3:39

Charts

References

External links
 

1979 songs
1980 singles
1995 singles
2004 singles
Kool & the Gang songs
Coolio songs
Lisa Stansfield songs
De-Lite Records singles
Tommy Boy Records singles
Edel AG singles
Songs about HIV/AIDS
Torch songs